Marco Soprano (born 25 January 1996) is an Italian footballer who plays as a defender for  club Trapani.

Club career
He made his Serie C debut for Bassano on 30 April 2016 in a game against Padova.

On 25 June 2019, he signed a 3-year contract with Teramo.

International career
Soprano played two matches for Italy U16 between 2011 and 2012.

References

External links
 
 

1996 births
Living people
Footballers from Venice
Footballers from Veneto
Italian footballers
Association football defenders
Serie C players
Serie D players
Genoa C.F.C. players
Cosenza Calcio players
Bassano Virtus 55 S.T. players
Alma Juventus Fano 1906 players
Fermana F.C. players
S.S. Teramo Calcio players
Trapani Calcio players
Italy youth international footballers